This is a summary of the electoral history of Liz Truss, the Member of Parliament for South West Norfolk since 2010 who served as Leader of the Conservative Party and Prime Minister of the United Kingdom from September - October 2022, making her the shortest serving Prime Minister in history. Truss previously served as Foreign Secretary from 2021 to 2022.

Council elections

1998 Greenwich London Borough Council election, Vanbrugh

2002 Greenwich London Borough Council election, Blackheath Westcombe

2006 Greenwich London Borough Council election, Eltham South

Parliamentary elections

2001 general election, Hemsworth

2005 general election, Calder Valley

2010 general election, South West Norfolk

2015 general election, South West Norfolk

2017 general election, South West Norfolk

2019 general election, South West Norfolk

2022 Conservative Party leadership election

Notes

References

Liz Truss
Truss, Liz
Truss, Liz
2022 Conservative Party (UK) leadership elections